The women's 400 metres event at the 2019 African Games was held on 26, 27 and 28 August in Rabat.

Medalists

Results

Heats
Qualification: First 3 in each heat (Q) and the next 4 fastest (q) advanced to the semifinals.

Semifinals
Qualification: First 4 in each semifinal (Q) advanced directly to the final.

Final

References

400
2019 in women's athletics